The Parroquia de San Juan Bautista, also known as the St. John the Baptist Church is a Roman Catholic church located in Daet, Camarines Norte, Philippines. It was built by the Franciscan friars in 1611.  It is one of the oldest churches in Camarines Norte.

History
The municipality of Daet was founded by the Franciscan missionaries in 1581. It was later abandoned for some years until 1611, when Fray Alonzo de Valdemoro, OFM, was appointed minister (Parish Priest). The first church was dedicated to the glorious precursor, St. John the Baptist, whose feast day is on June 24. Included in its jurisdiction were the visitas of Bactas and of Talisay was founded in 1654.

The Parish of St. John the Baptist presently covers twelve of the twenty five barangays of the town.  The rectory was constructed during the incumbency of Rev. Msgr. Pedro Espedido, H.P.. In 2011, the Parish Church celebrated the 400 year foundation of this parish church including the Parish of St. Peter the Apostle in Vinzons, and the Parish of Nuestra Señora de Candelaria in Paracale.

List of Recent Parish Priests

List of Parochial Vicars
 Rev. Fr. Efren S. Sanchez (March to July 1976)
 Rev. Fr. Cezar M. Echano, Jr. (1984 to 1987)
 Rev. Fr. Edwin J. Abel (1995 to 1997)
 Rev. Fr. Rowel Jose P. Abanto (1996 to 1998; 2008 to 2010)
 Rev. Fr. Jose Vaughn V. Banal (1997 to 1998)
 Rev. Fr. Ramiel A. Alvarez (1998 to 2004)
 Rev. Fr. Vicente V. Dimaterra III (2002 to 2003)
 Rev. Fr. Edwin M. Visda (2003 to 2004)
 Rev. Fr. Jose R. Julian (2004 to 2005)
 Rev. Fr. Andrei F. Uy (2004 to 2007; 2011 to 2016)
 Rev. Fr. Ronald I. Ravago (2004 to 2005)
 Rev. Fr. Juvenson C. Alarcon (2005 to 2006; 2010 to 2013)
 Rev. Fr. Norberto Z. Ochoa (2005 to 2006)
 Rev. Fr. Neil Leo L. Sureta (2006)
 Rev. Fr. Jose Chito M. Estrella (November 2006 to April 2007; 2015 to present)
 Rev. Fr. Fidel S. Era, Jr. (2006 to 2008; 2010 to 2011)
 Rev. Fr. Melvin B. Gamelo (February 2007 to 2009)
 Rev. Fr. Ronald Maquiñana (2008 to 2010)
 Rev. Fr. Angelito N. de Torres (March 2009 to 2010)
 Rev. Fr. Alejandro P. Cabonellas (2009 to 2010)
 Rev. Fr. Armando L. Orido (May 2010 to June 2011; 2016 to present)
 Rev. Fr. Rodrigo A. Lazarte (2010 to July 2014)
 Rev. Fr. Elmer A. Pandes (June 2011 to June 2013)
 Rev. Fr. Omar C. Oco (March to June 2013; 2014 to 2016)
 Rev. Fr. Rainier M. Abaño (July 2013 to August 2014)
 Rev. Fr. Ace D. Baracena (August 2014 to May 2015)
 Rev. Fr. Gerardo P. Nemi (September 2016 to present)

Attached Priest
 Rev. Msgr. Quirino G. Parcero, H.P. (1998 to 2001)
 Rev. Fr. Joselito Quiñones (2005 to 2006)
 Rev. Fr. Rogelio Orpiada (2008 to 2009)
 Rev. Fr. Alex C. Chavez (July 2013 to present)

Schedule of Services

Sacraments

Masses
 Monday to Friday: 6:00 am, 12:00 nn, 5:15 pm
 Saturday: 6:00 am; 5:15 pm (Anticipated Mass)
 Sunday: 5:00 am, 6:30 am, 8:00 am, 9:30 am; 3:00 pm (Children's Mass); 4:30 pm, 6:00 pm, 7:15 pm

Confessions
 Monday, Wednesday & Friday: 4:15 pm

Mass and Healing Services
 First Sunday of the Month: 10:30 am

Baptism
 Saturday & Sunday: 10:30 am

Wedding
By appointment at the Parish Office

Devotions
 Morning Prayer & Rosary: Monday to Saturday before the 6:00am Mass
 First Saturday Procession: Saturday at 6:15pm
 Holy Hour: First Thursday at 3:00pm
 Alliance of the Two Hearts Devotion: First Friday at 8:00pm

Novena
 St. Martin of Porres: Every Tuesday before the 5:15pm Mass
 Our Mother of Perpetual Help: Every Wednesday before the 6:00am, 12:00nn & 5:15pm Mass
 St. Jude Thaddeus: Every Thursday before the 5:15pm Mass
 Sacred Heart: Every First Friday before the 6:00am Mass
 Our Lady of Peñafrancia: Every Saturday before the 6:00am Mass

Adoration of the Blessed Sacrament
 Monday to Saturday: 7:00 am to 6:00 pm

References

Roman Catholic churches in Camarines Norte
1611 establishments in the Philippines
Roman Catholic churches completed in 1611
17th-century Roman Catholic church buildings in the Philippines
Churches in the Roman Catholic Diocese of Daet